Chinese rock (also , lit. "Chinese rock and roll music") is a wide variety of rock and roll music made by rock bands and solo artists from Mainland China (other regions such as Taiwan, Hong Kong, Macau are considered separate scenes). Typically, Chinese rock is a fusion of forms integrating Western popular music and traditional Chinese music.

History

The Northwest Wind (1980s)
Rock music did not take hold in Mainland China until the end of the Cultural Revolution and the onset of the Reform and Opening. The Peking All-Stars were a rock band formed in Beijing in 1979, by foreigners then resident in the Chinese capital.  While the first rock band in China, they were not Chinese.

Chinese rock had its origins in Northwest Wind style of music, which emerged as a main genre in Mainland China. The new style was triggered by two new songs, "Xintianyou" and "Nothing To My Name", both of which drew heavily on the folk song traditions of northern Shaanxi. They combined this with a western-style fast tempo, strong beat and extremely aggressive bass lines. In contrast to the mellow cantopop style, Northwest Wind songs were sung loudly and forcefully. It represented the musical branch of the large-scale Root-Seeking (xungen) cultural movement that also manifested itself in literature and in film. Cui Jian's Northwest Wind album Rock 'N' Roll on the New Long March, which included "Nothing To My Name", has been called "China's first rock album".

Many Northwest Wind songs were highly idealistic and heavily political, parodying or alluding to the revolutionary songs of the Communist state, such as "Nanniwan" and "The Internationale". It is associated with a non-Communist national music perspective instead of CCP revolutionary fervor. The music reflected disillusionment among Chinese youth, as well as the growing influence of Western concepts such as individuality and self-empowerment. Both the music and lyrics articulated a sense of pride in the independence and power of the northwest's peasantry. Songs such as "Sister Go Boldly Forward" came to represent an earthy, virile masculine (Yang) image of Mainland China, as opposed to the soft (Yin), civilized, polished urban gangtai HongKong style.

Birth of Chinese rock and roll (1984)
The birthplace of Chinese rock was the city of Beijing. In the nation's capital, rock music was highly politicized and open to a wide range of foreign influences. For most of the 1980s, rock music existed on the margins, represented by live performances in small bars and hotels. The music was almost exclusively the domain of university students and "underground" bohemian intelligentsia circles. By the late 1989 and early 1990 Chinese rock partially emerged into mainstream music as a combination of the growing popularity of Northwest Wind and prison song fads.

The first Chinese rock song was arguably the Northwest Wind anthem "Nothing To My Name", first performed in 1984 by Cui Jian, widely recognized as the father of Chinese rock. The song introduced into post-revolutionary China a whole new ethos that combined individualism, direct and bold expression. It soon came to symbolize the frustration harbored by a disillusioned generation of young intellectuals who had grown cynical about Communism and critical of China's the sterility and hypocrisy in traditional and contemporary culture. It also expressed, even for older Chinese, a dissatisfaction with unrealized promises of the CCP.

In the spring of 1989, "Nothing To My Name" became the de facto anthem of the student protestors at Tiananmen Square. Additionally, in May and July of that year, three of China's famous rock bands were established: Breathing (Huxi), Cobra, and Zang Tianshuo's 1989. Earlier rock music groups include "Infallible" (Budaoweng ), formed by Zang Tianshuo and Tang Dynasty (Tang Chao) lead vocalist and rhythm guitarist Ding Wu, and probably the most famous of all Chinese rock bands: "Black Panther" (Hei Bao ), originally fronted by China's alternative music pioneer Dou Wei.

Prison songs (1988–1989)
"Prison Songs" became popular in 1988 and early 1989, parallel to the Northwest Wind style. The fad was initiated by Chi Zhiqiang, who wrote lyrics about his time in jail and set them to folk melodies from northeast China. In contrast to Northwest Wind songs, prison songs were slow, "weepy" and invoked negative role models, often using vulgar language and expressing despair and cynicism. Their non-conformist values are apparent in such songs as "Mother Is Very Muddle-Headed" and "There Is Not a Drop of Oil in the Dish". The popularity of these songs reflected the fact that many Chinese during the 1980s became tired of official artistic representations and discourse. The patrons of prison songs were the urban youth, and private entrepreneurs, who at that time were mostly from marginal backgrounds.

Popular Chinese rock (1990–1993)

After the Tiananmen Square protests, rock became part of general urban youth Chinese culture. Its rise from the margins was celebrated on 17 and 18 February 1990, when Beijing's largest ever all-rock concert was held in the Capital Gymnasium, one of the city's largest halls. The concert featured six rock bands, among them are Cui Jian's ADO and Tang Dynasty. The criterion that the organizers set as qualification to participate was "originality".

Chinese rock reached a peak of creativity and popularity between 1990 and 1993.  In 1991, the glam metal band Black Panther released their self-titled debut album. With glossy production and hard rock melodies backing the sincere voice of lead singer Dou Wei, it featured hit singles such as "Don't Break My Heart and "Ashamed". A year later, the album went on to sell more than 1,000,000 copies nationwide, a standard never before achieved in Chinese rock history. Another band, Tang Dynasty, whose style was comparable to British heavy metal, successfully broke another barrier. Their singles "9/4 (a reference to the song's time signature)", "The Sun", and "Choice" climbed the charts. Once again, it was not until 1992, that their debut A Dream Return to Tang Dynasty sold over 2,000,000 copies throughout Asia, including Japan, Korea, and the Southeast.  From there, other previously formed rock bands, such as the first all female band, Cobra, and hard rockers The Face (each established in 1989), achieved greater success than ever. In addition, dozens of newer bands formed during the peak of their success, and rock music was performed on a regular basis. Big name artists and bands were featured in media such as CCTV and MTV, while other lesser known acts made a presence in small-scale, underground rock parties such as band leader Fa Zi who was perhaps the most well-known musician at art colony Yuan Ming Yuan near Bei Da in Beijing before it was closed down. The core participants in rock subculture adopted characteristic nonconformist appearance and behaviour. These included glam rock styles: pretty face, long hair, jeans, silver metal ornaments, black leather coats, as well as emerging grunge styles: flannel shirts, and do it yourself ethics, coupled with a carefree, hippie-style behaviour. The decline of Northwest Wind and simultaneous rise of rock music represented a shift in the attitude of many of China's intellectuals. Nostalgia changed into an unequivocally fierce negation, a sense of alienation from China's traditional and rural culture.

Rock goes underground, earns newfound respect (1994-1998)
By 1994, mainstream popularity of Chinese rock slowly began to ebb, due in no small part to strict censorship by the Communist party, such as the banning of rock from television and restrictions on performances. Moreover, the decline of rock reflected a decline of public interest in politicised cultural products, thoughts, or behaviors. People became increasingly motivated to engage with the market economy, to make money and improve their living standard.  Cross-border cultural exchange facilitated by increased economic openness, and the radical commercialization of the music industry in the mid-1990s led to importing overseas music, particularly from Taiwan and Hong Kong. Cantopop singers such as Andy Lau were sponsored by well-resourced record companies and derived revenues from film-making and advertising, two sources generally rejected by Chinese rock musicians. Moreover, the level of censorship imposed on c-pop was less strict, since gangtai culture is historically separate from mainland culture. 

With the tragedy of Nirvana frontman Kurt Cobain's death in 1994, a new underground movement emerged in popular music. That year, former Black Panther frontman Dou Wei released Dark Dreams. This album marked a complete departure from his "glam metal" days. Instead, this album emphasized thicker and more jangly guitars. Dou sang in a thin, almost apathetic drone-like voice and began experimenting with gothic and electronic sounds.  This innovative direction earned him a whole new kind of reputation, as well as credibility in the alternative culture movement. Another unlikely figure in the scene was the father of Chinese rock himself, Cui Jian.   A rare compilation album, titled "Rock Pioneers" was also released. The album showcased raw, rather unorthodox playing styles, as well as a rejection (even sometimes a mockery) of mainstream rock music. With the exception of Dream, the only band on the compilation to achieve mainstream success was Than Man, who went on to revitalize the popularity of rock back for "the masses." Self-styled punk He Yong fiercely resisted cantopop imitators on the mainland. His only album, Garbage Dump, was embraced by alienated Chinese youth, and earned him an enormous cult following. In 1995, a handful of younger punk bands (Brain Failure, Reflector, A Jerks, and 69) produced an album called "Wuliao Contingent," (alternate translation "Battalion of Boredom") representing the boredom and frustration collectively felt within the urban landscape. At the forefront was Brain Failure, the most successful of these bands, who continue to tour internationally with their ska/punk sound. English is used to both express what Chinese lyrics cannot, and also to crossover to the Western music market. In 1998 Hang on the Box were formed, the first all-girl Chinese punk band. One of the significant turning points for rock was Cui Jian's performance with The Rolling Stones in 2003 at the age of 42. It opened the genre to the rest of the world for the first time.

Rock Revival (2000–present)

From 2000 to 2004 post punk and extreme metal entered the underground scene and gained popularity among fans. In 2004–2005, Beijing's Joyside went on their first tour of China. American filmmaker Kevin Fritz followed them to make the film "Wasted Orient." It was released on DVD in 2007 by Plexifilm. The film is China's version of Decline Of Western Civilization (about the LA punk scene). It comically depicts the pitfalls associated with trying to tour a country that has little taste for Chinese rock n' roll music. In this film the original line-up of Joyside including Bian Yuan, Liu Hao, Fan Bo, Yang Yang, and Xin Shuang shows these colorful characters drowning away in alcohol. The film also includes some of Joyside's early music, which brought the band some public recognition. The film "Wasted Orient" is non-political, and avoids making superficial social commentary. While Joyside is not particularly known for the talent, the film presents Chinese rock music in the new millennium in a most authentic, raw, and genuine musical genre..

Director Kevin Fritz:

Presently, Chinese rock enjoys a new media forum in the popular Chinese television program, the "Pepsi Battle of the Bands"  a weekly live program featuring top 10 Rock bands from all over China who compete for weekly survival.  Each Episode features guest Celebrities such as, Cui Jian, Paul Wong, Richie Jen, Wang Feng, Van Fan, Jolin Tsai, Mayday, and Show Lo to name a few.  The show is sponsored by Pepsi, and produced by Ato Ato Integrated Media.

The Beijing Midi Modern School of Music and Music Festival
Another important step in the development of Chinese rock music had been the Beijing Midi School of Music in Beijing. Established 1993 by Zhang Fan, it was the first school nationally to offer classes for jazz music and rock music. Started as a school festival in 1999, the Midi Modern Music Festival advanced to the largest rock music festival nationally with up to 80000 visitors and over 100 bands. Both the school and the festival supported the underground scene across the country and opened the door for over 18 foreign bands in 2006 to perform at the festival and elsewhere in the country. (i.e. Alev, Monokino, Yokohama Music Association, The Wombats, etc.). 1

In addition to the Midi school, the Painkiller heavy music magazine started efforts to bring bands such as Edguy, Lacrimosa and Hatesphere to China and organized tours of the country for them. Especially in the metal and gothic genres these tours are considered milestones in China.

The 2008 Olympics and the Sichuan earthquake
A major drawback for the music scene in general was the cancellation of several events leading up to the 2008 Olympic Games, as well as the 2008 Sichuan earthquake. The 2008 Midi Modern Music Festival was cancelled (cancellation note) and delayed to October 2008, the Soilwork gig (preannouncement) had to be cancelled, as the band did not receive their visas and the German Esplanade in Chongqing was stopped by the organizers (change note).

The Sichuan earthquake in general shook the music scene and spawned dozens of "We are together" and "Think of Sichuan" gigs and charity events throughout Beijing and other cities. London Chinese Radio made a Special Earthquake Edition on their New Sounds of China podcast to cover this.

The Shanghai Scene
Historically more open to the outside, Shanghai is home to musicians from around the world. The unofficial home of the local jazz scene is JZ club while DJs and Electronic Producers frequently play The Shelter. Underground rock bands converge at Yuyintang. The 2010 World Expo and auxiliary events brought legal limitations to live performances and dried up venues temporarily, even censoring Shanghainese indie rock band Top Floor Circus. But since late 2010, Shanghai has seen a surge in concert goers, bands and live music venues with websites, blogs and independent record labels in English and Chinese dedicated to promoting concerts and artists. With Shanghai being the home of the most creative young talents, high school students also became well-involved in the city's rock scene. From 2010 to 2014, BRR Shanghai High School Music Festival held by The BRR Shanghai High School Music League (a coalition of the best high school musicians in Shanghai founded by Xu Qifei) grew increasingly influential and started the trend of high school music festivals in Shanghai.

Artists

Solo

Bands

See also
Midi Modern Music Festival
Beijing Pop Festival
Modern Sky Festival
C-pop
Cantopop
Chinese heavy metal
Mandopop
Taiwanese rock

Notes

References
Campbell, Jonathan (2011). Red Rock: The Long Strange March of Chinese Rock and Roll Earnshaw Books. Video of Campbell discussing his book.
Jones, Andrew F. (1992). Like a Knife: Ideology and Genre in Contemporary Chinese Popular Music. Ithaca, New York: East Asia Program, Cornell University.
Wong, Cynthia P. (2005). “‘Lost Lambs’: Rock, Gender, Authenticity, and a Generational Response to Modernity in the People's Republic of China.” Ph.D. dissertation. New York, New York: Columbia University, 2005.
Brace, Timothy L.(1992). " Modernization and Music in Contemporary China: Crisis, Identity, and the Politics of Style." Ph.D. dissertation. Austin, Texas: University of Texas, 1992.
Steen, Andreas. Der Lange Marsch des Rock'n'Roll, Pop- und Rockmusik in der Volksrepublik China. Berlin: LIT Verlag. 
Amar, Nathanel. (2022). "‘We come from the underground’: grounding Chinese punk in Beijing and Wuhan", Popular Music, Volume 41, Issue 2, pp. 170 - 193.

Compilations
2003 - Beijing Band 2001: New Rock Bands from the People's Republic of China. Kemaxiu Music.

External links
 Band forming timeline since 1984
timeline of all Chinese rock/punk/metal records over the last 20 years
Chinese Rock Database (Japanese, some English)
Rock in China (detailed archive about Chinese rock music in English)
Rock in China - Wiki (wiki system about Chinese rock music in English)
Heavy Metal Magazine from China: Painkiller Mag
Beijing Beat Regular column on the Chinese Music Scene.
Live at the Forbidden City Musician/author Dennis Rea's memoir of the early Chinese rock scene.
"A History of Chinese Rock: Post-Punk, Post-Politics and Post-Putonghua" An analysis of the stylistic development of rock in China
"The Sound Stage" A web video series produced by China Radio International in Beijing about underground Chinese music
 "Fa Zi's Chinese Rock & Roll History" Musician/author Kevin Salveson's memoir of the YuanMingYuan and Chinese rock scene in the early 1990s.

Radio stations playing Chinese rock
华流另类AllChinaAlternative https://web.archive.org/web/20090222033724/http://www.live365.com/stations/bluemonty2
伦敦华语 London Chinese Radio http://www.londonhuayu.co.uk/

Listening
Interview with Dennis Rea about early Chinese rock, from KUOW, November 9, 2006
"A History of Chinese Rock: Post-Punk, Post-Politics and Post-Putonghua" An analysis of the stylistic development of rock in China Paul Kendall April 2009

Chinese styles of music
Rock music by country